Beverly Hatzell (later Volkert; February 19, 1929 – August 28, 2005) was an American pitcher for the All-American Girls Professional Baseball League between 1949 and 1951.  She both batted and threw right-handed.

Born in Redkey, Indiana, Beverly was the second of five children born to Gerald and Velma Hatzell. She played for four teams of the All-American Girls Professional Baseball League: the Battle Creek Belles, the Chicago Colleens, Peoria Redwings and the Racine Belles.

Beverly Hatzell Volkert died in 2005, aged 76, in Hicksville, Ohio. She is survived by her husband, Mervin Volkert. The couple had no children.

Career statistics
Seasonal Pitching Records

Seasonal Batting Records

References

External links
Chicago Colleens Players on Tour Photograph, 1949. National Baseball Hall of Fame. Retrieved 2019-04-14.

1929 births
2005 deaths
All-American Girls Professional Baseball League players
Chicago Colleens players
Racine Belles (1943–1950) players
Battle Creek Belles players
Peoria Redwings players
Baseball players from Indiana
People from Jay County, Indiana
20th-century American women
20th-century American people
21st-century American women